Máté is a surname of Hungarian origin.

Notable examples of the surname Máté include:

People

Gábor Máté (athlete), Hungarian discus thrower
Gábor Máté (physician), a Hungarian-born Canadian physician and expert on Addiction and Stress
Ilya Mate (born 1956), a Soviet Ukrainian wrestler
János Máté (born 1990), a Hungarian footballer
Ferenc Máté (born 1945), a Hungarian author
Gergő Máté (born 1990), a Hungarian footballer
Péter Máté (1947-1984), a Hungarian singer, composer, and pianist
Péter Máté (footballer) (born 1984), a Hungarian footballer
Péter Máté (footballer born 1979), a Hungarian footballer
Rudolph Maté, an Austro-Hungarian film director,
Sébastien Maté, French footballer
Tibor Máté (1914-2007), a Hungarian handballer
Vasily Mate (1856–1917), Russian artist and engraver
András Máté (1940-2012),a Hungarian footballer
Alexander Máté (born 1984),a German SAP BW Consultant
Patrick Maté (born 1964),a French Animator,Character designer and Storyboard artist.

See also
 Máté (given name)

Hungarian-language surnames
Surnames of Hungarian origin